Anil Zankar

Career 
Anil Zankar is a recipient of two national awards, one for a film script and the other for a book on cinema and a visiting faculty of humanities and social sciences at the Indian Institute of Science Education and Research, Pune. He has 35 years of experience in filmmaking, teaching and writing. Zankar is an alumnus of the Film and Television Institute of India (FTII, Pune). He has made 21 short films on social issues and institutions, biopics and corporate themes. He is a historian of cinema. What's more, he has attended seminars on international cinema, has presented papers at international conferences (Poland, 2006; Japan, 2014) and has been invited as a visiting scholar by the Indian Institute of Advanced Studies (Shimla, 2014). [1][2][3][4] Anil Zankar has taught at the Department of Humanities and Social Sciences, IISER Pune since 2017.

Editor
Lights Camera Action was published in collaboration with BFI, UK.

Writer
Mughal-e-Azam - HarperCollins (author)
Routledge Handbook Of Indian Cinema (co-author)
Britannica - Encyclopaedia of Hindi Cinema (co-author)
Cinemachi Goshta

Speaker at Conferences
Goa Arts and Literature Festival
Taj Literature Festival (Agra)
Pune International Literary Festival

Actor

He has played cameos in two recent productions, as Dr. Kamath in Mission Mangal and as Sitaram Yechuri in Accidental Prime Minister.

Jury member
FCCI Award for Best Indian Film, at the All Lights India International Film Festival

See also
Film Critics Circle of India

References

External links
 Anil Zankar

Indian film critics